Planet Groove is a music oriented talk show that premiered in late-1996 on BET, when the short-lived Unreal was cancelled. This show's hostess was Rachel Stuart (who originally hosted Caribbean Rhythms). Like Video Soul, the show had a primetime slot, airing from 8PM-10PM (Eastern Time) as a 2-hour long music video program. It also had a Top-20 countdown on Fridays as well.

Hour change/New time
In late 1997, the show's time slot was changed to 7PM-9PM (Eastern). 1998 saw a decrease in hours, going from two hours to one.

Cancellation
With decrease in popularity, the show was cancelled in 1999. Planet Groove was somewhat revived when BET launched 106 & Park in 2000. 106 & Park was a top-ten video countdown show that aired live every weekday in the U.S. and Japan. It was cancelled in 2014.

References 

1990s American television talk shows
BET original programming
1996 American television series debuts
1999 American television series endings